Nombuyiselo Gladys Adoons (born 18 August 1978) is a South African politician who is a Member of Parliament (MP) for the African National Congress.

Parliamentary career
In 2019, she stood for election to the South African National Assembly as 3rd on the African National Congress's North West regional list. At the election, Adoons won a seat in the National Assembly. She was sworn in on 22 May 2019. On 27 June 2019, she became a member of the Portfolio Committee on Basic Education.

References

External links
Nombuyiselo Gladys Adoons – Parliament of South Africa

Living people
1978 births
African National Congress politicians
Members of the National Assembly of South Africa
Women members of the National Assembly of South Africa
21st-century South African politicians